The football competition at the 1990 Central American and Caribbean Games started on 21 November.

Group A

Standings

Group B

Standings

Group C

Standings

Second round

Group 1

Standings

Group 2

Standings

Third Place

Final

External links

1990 Central American and Caribbean Games
1990
1990 in CONCACAF football
1990